The 2018 CONCACAF Women's Championship was an international women's football tournament held in the United States from 4–17 October 2018. The eight national teams involved in the tournament were required to register a squad of 20 players, including two goalkeepers. Only players in these squads were eligible to take part in the tournament.

The provisional 35-player squad lists were announced on 10 September 2018. From the preliminary squad, the final list of 20 players per national team was submitted to CONCACAF 24 hours before each team's first match. 

The final 20-player roster (2 must be goalkeepers) for each team was announced by CONCACAF on 26 September 2018. Following this, only injury-related replacements were permitted.

The position listed for each player is per the official squad list published by CONCACAF. The age listed for each player is on 4 October 2018, the first day of the tournament. The numbers of caps and goals listed for each player do not include any matches played after the start of tournament. The nationality for each club reflects the national association (not the league) to which the club is affiliated.

Group A

Mexico
Coach: Roberto Medina

Panama
Coach: Víctor Suárez

Trinidad and Tobago
Coach: Shawn Cooper

United States
Coach: Jill Ellis

Group B

Canada
Coach:  Kenneth Heiner-Møller

Costa Rica
Coach: Amelia Valverde

Cuba
Coach: Reniel Bonora

Defected

Jamaica
Coach: Hue Menzies

References

Squads
2018